Magnago may refer to:

Magnago, a comune (municipality) in the Province of Milan in the Italian region Lombardy
Cassano Magnago, a town and comune in the province of Varese, Lombardy

People with the surname
Silvius Magnago (1914–2010), Italian politician and lawyer

Italian-language surnames